The San Pedro side-blotched lizard (Uta palmeri) is a species of lizard. Its range is in Mexico.

References 

Uta
Reptiles of Mexico
Reptiles described in 1890
Taxa named by Leonhard Stejneger